The men's 100 metre breaststroke event at the 1972 Olympic Games took place between August 29 and August 30. This swimming event used the breaststroke. Because an Olympic size swimming pool is 50 metres long, this race consisted of two lengths of the pool.

Medalists

Results

Heats
Heat 1

Heat 2

Heat 3

Heat 4

Heat 5

Heat 6

Semifinals

Final

Key: WR = World record

References

Men's breaststroke 100 metre
Men's events at the 1972 Summer Olympics